The Heresy Act 1382 (5 Ric. II, St. 2, c. 5) was an Act of the Parliament of England. The Act stated that the Chancellor should issue commissions for the arrest of heretical preachers by the authority of certificates from the bishops. The Act was repealed in a later Parliament of the same year as the knights of the shires claimed it had not passed the House of Commons.

Notes

Acts of the Parliament of England concerning religion
1380s in law
1382 in England
Heresy in Christianity in the Middle Ages
Christianity in medieval England